Alex Andreas is an Australian actor known for his roles in television, film and theatre.

His recent credits include 'Dimitri' in the mystery thriller The Tourist and ''George Stathopoulos' in the crime comedy-drama My Life is Murder.

Filmography

References

External links

Australian male film actors
Australian male television actors
Australian people of Greek descent
Living people
Year of birth missing (living people)
21st-century Australian male actors